Million Dollar Legs is the second album by the New Tony Williams Lifetime, released in 1976 on Columbia Records. The band was made up of jazz fusion drummer Tony Williams with Allan Holdsworth, Alan Pasqua and Tony Newton.

Track listing 
 "Sweet Revenge" (Tony Williams) — 6:03
 "You Did It to Me Baby" (Williams, Al Cleveland) — 3:45
 "Million Dollar Legs" (Williams) — 6:38
 "Joy Filled Summer" (Tony Newton) — 5:50
 "Lady Jane" (Alan Pasqua) — 3:56
 "What You Do to Me" (Williams) — 6:38
 "Inspirations of Love" (Newton) — 9:48

Personnel 
 Allan Holdsworth – guitar 
 Alan Pasqua – keyboards 
 Tony Newton – bass, vocals 
 Tony Williams – drums 
 Jack Nitzsche – string and horn arrangements

References 

The Tony Williams Lifetime albums
1976 albums
Albums produced by Bruce Botnick
Columbia Records albums
albums arranged by Jack Nitzsche